The Fall 2021 NISA season was the third season of the National Independent Soccer Association's third-division soccer competition. The season took place only during the Fall in order to realign the league's seasons with the calendar year. The league also organized the second edition of its pre-season cup competition, the NISA Independent Cup.

Teams
The nine teams that participated in the 2020-21 Spring season all returned. They were joined by expansion club Chicago House AC.

Stadiums and locations

Personnel and sponsorship
''Note: The league has signed a deal with Hummel to be the official kit manufacturer, but it still allows clubs to find their own provider.

Managerial changes

NISA Independent Cup
The NISA Independent Cup will start on July 9. It features seven of the ten NISA clubs, with Michigan Stars FC and Stumptown AC opting not to participate and San Diego 1904 FC withdrawing before the start of the tournament. They will be joined by 28 invited amateur teams and divided geographically into nine regions of four clubs each. Each region will play a single round robin tournament with the team earning the most points in each region declared regional champion. Like last year, there will be no interregional play or national champion.

Participating Clubs

Great Lakes Region

Standings

Results

Mid-Atlantic Region

Standings

Results

Midwest Region

Standings

Results

New England Region
The match between New Amsterdam FC and Lansdowne Yonkers FC was originally scheduled for July 17 and was to be hosted at Hudson Sports Complex in Warwick, New York. However, weather forced the match to be postponed to a later date. The game was played on July 28 but was instead hosted by Lansdowne at Flemings Field in Yonkers, New York.

Standings

Results

Pacific Region
On July 22, the league announced that California Victory FC had withdrawn from the tournament after playing one match, a 1-1 draw against Bay Cities FC. This result was expunged.

Standings

Results

South Central Region

Standings

Results

Southeast Region

Standings

Results

Southwest Region
The Southwest Region is the only region of the Independent Cup that does not consist of four clubs. On July 7, NISA announced on Twitter that 1904 FC had withdrawn from the tournament just 48 hours before the tournament was set to begin. Therefore, the Southwest Region would continue as a three team round-robin.

Standings

Results

West Coast Region

Standings

Results

Regular season
The Fall season started on August 6, and saw the ten teams play each other twice, in a single-table format. There were no playoffs; the team leading the table at the end of the season was declared champion. The season ended on November 21.

Standings

Results

Player statistics

Top goalscorers

Top assists

Clean sheets

Hat-tricks

Attendance
Games without fans reported are not counted in averages or games played.

League awards

All-league teams

See also 
 National Independent Soccer Association

References

External links 
 NISA official website

2021
2021 in American soccer leagues
Impact of the COVID-19 pandemic on sports